Techné: Research in Philosophy and Technology is a peer-reviewed academic journal with a focus on philosophical analysis of technological systems. Established in 1995 as the Society for Philosophy and Technology Quarterly Electronic Journal, it has continuously published in electronic format under its present name since 2000. Techné is sponsored by  the Society for Philosophy and Technology and published for the society by the Philosophy Documentation Center. The current editors-in-chief are Kirk Besmer and Ashley Shew.

Abstracting and indexing
The journal is abstracted and indexed in the following bibliographic databases:

See also 
 List of philosophy journals

References

External links
 

English-language journals
Philosophy journals
Publications established in 1995
Triannual journals
Philosophy of technology
Philosophy Documentation Center academic journals